The 1951 All England Championships was a badminton tournament held at the Empress Hall, Earls Court, London, England, from 7–11 March 1951.

Final results

Queenie Allen married and competed as Queenie Webber.

Men's singles

Section 1

Section 2

+ Denotes seeded player

Women's singles

Section 1

Section 2

References

All England Open Badminton Championships
All England Badminton Championships
All England Open Badminton Championships in London
All England Championships
All England Badminton Championships
All England Badminton Championships